The 28th Golden Rooster Awards was an award ceremony honoring the best Chinese language films of 2010–11. The award ceremony was held in Hefei, Anhui Province. It hosted by Wu Gang who had won Best Actor the previous year, with an opening performance by Zhao Wei, and was broadcast by CCTV Movie Channel.

Schedule

Winners and nominees 

{| class=wikitable style="width="150%"
|-
! ! style="background:gold; width=;"50%"| Best Film
! ! style="background:gold; width=;"50%"| Best Director
|-
| valign="top" |

Shen Zhou 11
The Piano in a Factory
Sui Sui Qing Ming
Love On Gallerv Bridge
Aftershock

| valign="top" |

Chen Li－Love On Gallerv Bridge
Zhang Meng－The Piano in a Factory
Ning Cai－Mother
An Zhanjun－Jing Sha
Feng Xiaogang－Aftershock
Gao Feng－Lao Zhai

|-
! ! style="background:gold; width=;"50%"| Best Directorial Debut
! ! style="background:gold; width=;"50%"| Best Writing
|-
| valign="top" |
Lu Yang－My Spectacular Theatre
Jiang Wenli－Lan
Du Bo/Guo Zhirong－Blue School
Deng Ke－Angle
Gao Feng－An Eternal Lamb

| valign="top" |

Cheng Xiaoling－Sui Sui Qing Ming
Xing Yuanping－Lao Zhai
Zhang Meng－The Piano in a Factory
Su Xiaowei－Aftershock
Liu Jianwei/Liu Hongwei/Wang Qiang/Zhao Junfang/Liang Shuibao－Shen Zhou 11
Yang Xiaoyan/Wang Jing－Hai Zi Na Xie Shi Er

|-
! ! style="background:gold; width=;"50%"| Best Actor
! ! style="background:gold; width=;"50%"| Best Actress
|-
| valign="top" |

Sun Chun－Qiu Xi
Guo Fucheng－Love for Life
Liu Zhibing－Shen Zhou 11
Wang Qianyuan－The Piano in a Factory
Zhu Xu－Lan

| valign="top" |

Naren Hua－MotherLü Liping－City Monkey
Qian Peiyi－Sui Sui Qing Ming
Qin Hailu－The Piano in a Factory
Xu Fan－Aftershock
Yan Bingyan－Close to Me

|-
! ! style="background:gold; width=;"50%"| Best Supporting Actor
! ! style="background:gold; width=;"50%"| Best Supporting Actress
|-
| valign="top" |Xu Caigen－Apart TogetherBa Yin－Beyond the Sacred LandHuang Xiaoming－The MessageJin Shijie－Blind CinemaLi Xinmin－Lao ZhaiZhao Erkang－Secret Fragrance| valign="top" |

Guo Ge－Through Stunning Storms
Jiang Qinqin－Bright SunshineJiang Ruijia－Shen Zhou 11Li Bin－City MonkeyZaiyinaipu Ailemutayi－An Eternal LambZhang Jingchu－Aftershock|-
! ! style="background:gold; width=;"50%"| Best Cinematography
! ! style="background:gold; width=;"50%"| Best Art Direction
|-
| valign="top" |The Seal of Love－Sun MingAftershock－Lü Yue
Qing Gui Tao Ran Ting－Song Dehua
Mother－Shao Dan
Fairy Tales－Li Li
Through Stunning Storms－Cai Shunan

| valign="top" |Aftershock－Huo TingxiaoQiu Xi－Shen Xiaoyong
The Message－Xiao Haihang/Yang Haoyu
The Seal of Love－Zhou Xinren
Love On Gallerv Bridge－Zhou Jinglun

|-
! ! style="background:gold; width=;"50%"| Best Music
! ! style="background:gold; width=;"50%"| Best Sound Recording
|-
| valign="top" |Aftershock－Wang LiguangAn Eternal Lamb－ Wu Yongmei
Love On Gallerv Bridge－ Zhang Hongguang
Love for Life－Zuo Xiaozuzhou
Bodyguards and Assassins－ Chan Kwong Wing

| valign="top" |The Founding of Republic－Wang DanrongAftershock－Wu Jiang
Sky Fighters－Wang Lewen/An Shaofeng
Bodyguards and Assassins－Yang Jingyi
The Seal of Love－Zhao Jun

|-
! ! style="background:gold; width=;"50%"| Best Documentary
! ! style="background:gold; width=;"50%"| Best Popular Science Film
|-
| valign="top" |My Garden of Eden在一起城市之光I Wish I Knew| valign="top" |变暖的地球巧治松材线虫枸杞高产高效种植技术草原生态保护鲟鱼繁殖新技术|-
! ! style="background:gold; width=;"50%"| Best Children Feature
! ! style="background:gold; width=;"50%"| Best Chinese Opera Film
|-
| valign="top" |Close to Me幸福的向日葵孩子那些事儿Xing HaiBlue School| valign="top" |响九霄十五贯流花溪清风亭|-
! ! style="background:gold; width=;"50%"| Best Animation
! ! style="background:gold; width=;"50%"| 
|-
| valign="top" |Legend of a RabbitXi Bai PoTiger returns| valign="top" |

|}

Special awards
 Lifetime Achievement Award
 Fu Zhengyi (Editor)
 Xiang Junshu (Dubbing Actress)
 Special Jury Award
 Film: The Piano in a Factory'' 
 Filmmaker: Zhu Xu

References

External links 
 Result of 28th Golden Rooster Awards

2010-2011
Golden
Gold